Frederick II von Graben (died before 1463), also called Frederick the Younger, was a Styrian noble, a member of the edelfrei Von Graben family. He held the titles as Lord of Kornberg and Marburg, the Lordship Marburg, (in Lower Styria), as well as burgrave of Riegersburg.
 One of the most affluent Styrian nobles, Frederick was an advisor to the Habsburg emperor Frederick III, assessor at the Reichskammergericht, and member of the duchy's Landtag assembly.

Life
Frederick's ancestors were of the Kornberg branch (Styria) of the Von Graben family. His parents were Frederick I von Graben (died  at Kornberg Castle), progenitor of the Kornberg line, and Katharina von Sumerau or Saurau. Frederick II succeeded his father in Styria, while his brother Andreas von Graben (d. 1463) inherited the Carinthian (Ortenburg) estates of his wife.

In 1438 he married Elisabeth Steinwald von Fladnitz with whom he had four children  One of them, Ulrich III von Graben (d. 1486), a loyal follower of Emperor Frederick III, was appointed Landeshauptmann / governor of the Styrian duchy. 

Frederick first appeared in a 1401 deed, when he received the burgraviate of Riegersburg serving the Walsee noble dynasty from Swabia. He soon acquired further estates from Seckau Abbey and, since 1443, owned the villages of Neudorf and Pölan as well as parts of the villages Altendorf near Wolfsberg in Carinthia and Wanofezen. From 1446 he is documented as a member of the Styrian estates (Landstände) and in 1456 received, together with his son Ulrich III, the pawned the Lordship Marburg with Obermarburg and Maribor Castle from the Walsee owners. In 1461 he signed a contract in which Laibach (Ljubljana) in Carniola became the see of a diocese.

Notes 

People from Styria
Medieval Austrian nobility
Medieval Austrian knights
15th-century Austrian people